Sargvere is a village in Paide Parish, Järva County in northern-central Estonia.

Nurmsi Airfield (ICAO: EENI) is partially located on the territory of Sargvere.

References

Villages in Järva County
Kreis Jerwen